The Howard Hughes Memorial Award is an aviation industry award presented annually by the Aero Club of Southern California. According to the Association's official website, the award is given "to an aerospace leader whose accomplishments over a long career have contributed significantly to the advancement of aviation or space technology."

The award was established in 1978 by William R. Lummis, a first cousin of aviation pioneer Howard Hughes, who at the time was Chairman of the Board and Chief Executive Officer of Summa Corp. Recipients of the Howard Hughes Memorial Award receive a solid silver medallion cast from silver mined from Hughes' Nevada mining operations.

Recipients 
 Jack Northrop
 Jimmy Doolittle
 Lawrence A. Hyland
 Robert Six
 Kelly Johnson
 Chuck Yeager
 Ed Heinemann
 Barry Goldwater
 Pete Conrad
 Allen E. Paulson
 Simon Ramo
 Jack Real
 Ben Rich
 Clifton Moore
 Lee Atwood
 Harry Wetzel
 Bobbi Trout
 Thomas Victor Jones
 Allen Puckett
 Paul MacCready
 John Brizendine
 Willis Hawkins
 Sam Iacobellis
 Kent Kresa
 Neil Armstrong
 Frank D. Robinson
 Burt Rutan
 Eileen Collins
 James Albaugh
 Ron Sugar
 Bob Hoover
 Fred Smith
 Clay Lacy
 Steven F. Udvar-Házy
 Edward Stone

See also

 List of aviation awards

References
 The Howard Hughes Memorial Award at the Southern California Aeronautic Association official website

Aviation awards
Howard Hughes